Landing craft carriers or landing craft depot ships were an innovative type of amphibious warfare ship developed by the Imperial Japanese Army during World War II. The prototype was developed in secrecy under the pseudonyms Ryujo Maru and Fuso Maru using features later adopted by other navies for dock landing ships and amphibious transport docks. Additional ships were built after combat experience validated the concept, but most were completed after the Japanese invasions of the early war, and used primarily as troopships during later operations. Today's amphibious assault ships bear a strong similarity to this concept.

Prototype
 was completed in 1935 and modified in 1936 to include a floodable well dock. She was the world's first ship specifically designed to carry and launch landing craft. She introduced stern and side gates to launch landing craft for the 2,200 soldiers she carried. She demonstrated the advantages of the concept at the invasions of Shanghai, Malaya and Java.

Hei-type
Hei-type landing craft carriers included a flight deck with a capacity for 28 aircraft, but no hangar deck, since the deck beneath the flight deck was used to carry 25 landing craft launched through stern doors. Akisu Maru was completed in time to participate in the invasion of Java; but she and the other Hei-types were thereafter used primarily as ferries to transport short-range aircraft to distant bases. The first two were completed from 11,800-ton,  Nippon Kaiun, K. K. passenger ships under construction by Harima Shipbuilding. They operated two Kayaba Ka-1 autogyros. Both were sunk by submarines in 1944. 
  was completed in January 1942.
  was completed in March 1943.
The others were based on Hitachi Shipbuilding Corporation's standard 8,000-ton,  Type-M cargo steam ship modified (Type-MB) to carry twelve  launched through stern doors with funnels installed horizontally on the starboard side to accommodate a flight deck.
  was completed in March 1945 and survived for use as a repatriation ship.
 Tokitsu Maru was incomplete when World War II ended. She was completed as a whaling ship in 1946 and sank in the Antarctic in 1953.

Ko-type
The larger type were 11,910-ton,  diesel-engined ships fitted with stern ramp gates for launching twenty  stored in floodable holds. At the time, this launching method was unprecedented. Both were sunk by submarines with very heavy loss of life.
  was completed in December 1942.
  was completed in January 1944.
Later production was Hitachi's standard Type-M steam ship modified (Type-MA) to carry twelve Toku-Daihatsu-class landing craft. The landing craft were launched from rails which ran along the main deck (between port and starboard funnels for those carried forward of the superstructure) down to the waterline through large hinged doors at the stern. Settsu Maru survived for use as a repatriation ship, but her sister ships were sunk in air raids on Japanese ports.
 Kibitsu Maru was completed in December 1943.
 Hyuga Maru was completed in November 1944.
 Settsu Maru was completed as a  coal-burner in January 1945.

Otsu-type
Takatsu Maru was a 5,656-ton, 19-knot steam ship completed in January 1944 with icebreaker capability, and used conventional cranes rather than gates for handling nine Toku-Daihatsu-class landing craft. She was sunk by United States aircraft in Ormoc Bay during the invasion of the Philippines.

References

Amphibious warfare vessels of Japan
Auxiliary ships of the Imperial Japanese Navy
World War II amphibious warfare vessels